This is a list of awards and nominations received by The Departed.

References

External links
 

Lists of accolades by film